Primordial Inflation Polarization Explorer (PIPER) is a high-altitude scientific balloon program designed to fly a millimeter-wave telescope for the purpose investigate the nascent stages of the universe. 

The program is planned and funded by NASA's Goddard Space Flight Center, and being overseen by the astrophysicist Al Kogut.

References 

Balloon-borne experiments
Balloons (aeronautics)
Goddard Space Flight Center